The 1999 Trans-Am Series was the 34th season of the Sports Car Club of America's Trans-Am Series. 1999 was the end of the "American muscle revival" era of Trans-Am, as Italian manufacturer Qvale would win the championship the following year. Ford would sweep the season. Paul Gentilozzi won the drivers' championship.

Results

References

Trans-Am Series
Trans-Am